John Cawley may refer to:

 John Calley (engineer) (1663–1725), or Cawley, metalworker, plumber and glass-blower
 John Cawley (priest) (1632–1709), Anglican priest